Ciudad Quesada is a district in the municipality of Rojales in the Province of Alicante, Spain. It has a population of 16,583 people (INE 2013).

It is located in the southern area of Rojales, 6 km from Mediterranean sea. Justo Quesada, a Spanish entrepreneur, started the city in the 1970s and it is now considered to be a Spanish town with its own town hall.

Ciudad Quesada also has a Norwegian school called Den Norske Skolen I Rojales (DNSR).

References 

Populated places in the Province of Alicante
Towns in Spain